Methow may refer to:

 Methow (tribe), a Native American tribe
 Methow, Washington
 Methow River